Glenn Freemantle is a British sound editor and sound designer.

He was nominated at the 81st Academy Awards for Best Sound Editing for his work on the film Slumdog Millionaire. He received a second nomination and his first win in the same category for Gravity at the 86th Academy Awards.

He has over 130 credits since his start in 1981.

References

External links
 

British sound editors
Living people
Best Sound Editing Academy Award winners
Best Sound BAFTA Award winners
Year of birth missing (living people)